Nowshahr County is in Mazandaran province, Iran. The capital of the county is the city of Nowshahr. At the 2006 census, the county's population was 116,334 in 31,842 households. The following census in 2011 counted 128,647 people in 38,496 households. At the 2016 census, the county's population was 138,913 in 45,759 households.

Administrative divisions

The population history and structural changes of Nowshahr County's administrative divisions over three consecutive censuses are shown in the following table. The latest census shows two districts, six rural districts, and three cities.

References

 

Counties of Mazandaran Province